Siemen Voet (born 3 February 2000) is a Belgian footballer who currently plays for Slovan Bratislava, mostly as a centre back.

Personal life
While he scored the opening goal in a 3–1 win against Oud-Heverlee Leuven on 12 October 2019, Derwael became World Champion just some minutes later.

References

External links

2000 births
Living people
Belgian footballers
Belgium youth international footballers
Belgian expatriate footballers
Association football midfielders
Club Brugge KV players
K.V. Mechelen players
K.S.V. Roeselare players
PEC Zwolle players
ŠK Slovan Bratislava players
Belgian Pro League players
Challenger Pro League players
Eredivisie players
Slovak Super Liga players
Expatriate footballers in the Netherlands
Belgian expatriate sportspeople in the Netherlands
Expatriate footballers in Slovakia
Belgian expatriate sportspeople in Slovakia
People from Lochristi